L'Agulhas is the most southern coastal village and holiday resort in South Africa, located within the Cape Agulhas Local Municipality at the southernmost tip of the African mainland. The name "Agulhas", Portuguese for "needles", is said to have been given to the cape because the compass-needle was seen to point due north, that is, with no magnetic deviation. The Agulhas Bank is reputed to be the richest fishing area in the Southern Hemisphere. Some of the older residents and documents refer to the town as by its former name Cape Agulhas or Cape L'Agulhas or simply Agulhas which were the names that referred to this town before it was changed to L'Agulhas to avoid confusion when the Bredasdorp Municipality changed its name to The Cape Agulhas Municipality (CAM).

Tourist interests and activities include: A visit to the Lighthouse with a view from the tower and a walkway along the seafront to the new most southern African monument and a place where two oceans meet at the foot of Africa. A little further along the walkway is the shipwreck of Meisho Maru. Tourists also enjoy the local fynbos plants, bird watching, hiking, swimming in the local tidal pools or a game of Jukskei on Saturday mornings. Other interests are visiting arts and craft shops, local wine sales, shops and restaurants or enjoy a meal at one of the best local fish restaurants in the area. L’Agulhas is a peaceful town and a ‘get away’ from busy city living.

Lighthouse 

The Cape Agulhas Lighthouse, the second-oldest working lighthouse in South Africa, is at the southern end of the town. Designed by Colonel Charles Cornwell Michell in homage to the Pharos of Alexandria, the lighthouse was lit on March 1, 1849. Some 150 ships lay scattered along the South African coast, many due to the treacherous Agulhas Reef. It is in memory of the countless lives lost and to warn passing ships of the pending danger that the Cape Agulhas Lighthouse was designed and built. The lighthouse was declared a National Monument in 1973.

Geography

Climate
L'Agulhas has a mild semi-arid climate (BSk, according to the Köppen climate classification). Summers are mild and dry, winters are cool and wetter.

Another source gives different data, showing that it has a warm-summer Mediterranean climate (Köppen: Csb), with most precipitation falling in June.

See also
 Cape Agulhas
 Agulhas National Park

External links
 History of Cape Agulhas

References

 L'Agulhas

Populated places in the Cape Agulhas Local Municipality
Populated coastal places in South Africa